Romanian archaeology begins in the 19th century.

Archaeologists 

 Alexandru Odobescu (1834—1895)
 Grigore Tocilescu (1850–1909)
 Vasile Pârvan (1882–1927)
 Constantin Daicoviciu (1898–1973)
living
 Gheorghe I. Cantacuzino (b. 1938)
 Adrian Andrei Rusu (b. 1951) – medieval archaeology, researcher at the Institute of Archaeology and Art History in Cluj-Napoca

Institutes 
 Institute of Archaeology and Art History in Cluj-Napoca
 Vasile Pârvan Institute of Archaeology in Bucharest

Museums 

 Archaeology Museum Piatra Neamț
 Iron Gates Region Museum
 Museum of Dacian and Roman Civilisation
 National Museum of Romanian History
 National Museum of Transylvanian History

Sites 

 Acidava (Enoşeşti) – Dacian, Roman
 Apulon (Piatra Craivii) – Dacian
 Apulum (Alba Iulia) – Roman, Dacian
 Argedava (Popeşti) – Dacian, possibly Burebista's court or capital
 Argidava (Vărădia) – Dacian, Roman
 Basarabi (Calafat) – Basarabi culture (8th - 7th centuries BC), related to Hallstatt culture
 Boian Lake – Boian culture  (dated to 4300–3500 BC)
 Callatis (Mangalia) – Greek colony
 Capidava – Dacian, Roman
 Cernavodă – Cernavodă culture, Dacian
 Coasta lui Damian (Măerişte)
 Dacian Fortresses of the Orăştie Mountains
 Drobeta – Roman
 Giurtelecu Şimleului
 Histria – Greek colony
 Lumea Noua (near  Alba Iulia) –  middle Neolithic to Chalcolithic
 Napoca (Cluj-Napoca) – Dacian, Roman
 Peștera cu Oase – the oldest early modern human remains in Europe
 Porolissum (near Zalău) – Roman
 Potaissa (Turda) – Roman
 Sarmizegetusa Regia – Dacian capital
 Sarmizegetusa Ulpia Traiana – Roman capital of province of Dacia
 Trophaeum Traiani/Civitas Tropaensium (Adamclisi) – Roman
 Tomis (Constanţa) – Greek colony
 Ziridava/Şanţul Mare (Pecica) – Dacian, Pecica culture, 16 archaeological horizons have been distinguished, starting with the Neolithic and ending with the Feudal Age

Cultures 

 Basarabi culture
 Boian culture
 Bug-Dniester culture
 Bükk culture
 Cernavoda culture
 Chernyakhov culture
 Coțofeni culture
 Cucuteni-Trypillian culture
 Danubian culture
 Dudeşti culture
 Globular Amphora culture
 Gumelniţa-Karanovo culture
 Hamangia culture
 La Tène culture
 Linear Pottery culture
 Lipiţa culture
 Otomani culture
 Pecica culture
 Tiszapolgár culture
 Usatovo culture
 Vinča culture
 Wietenberg culture
 Getae
 Dacians
 Roman

Literature 
 Alexandru Odobescu, Istoria arheologiei, 1877

Publications 
 Dacia by Vasile Pârvan Institute of Archaeology, published continuously since 1924

See also 
 List of Romanian archaeologists
 History of Romania
 Prehistory of Transylvania
 Bronze Age in Romania
 Archaeological looting in Romania
 Dacia

Notes 

Archaeology-related lists
Prehistory of Romania